Mike Blabac may refer to:
 Mike Blabac (sledge hockey) (born 1974), American ice sledge hockey player
 Mike Blabac (photographer), American photographer